Dracaena halapepe, synonym Pleomele halapepe, the royal hala pepe, is a species of flowering plant that is endemic to the island of Oahu in Hawaii. It is threatened by habitat loss.

References

 World Conservation Monitoring Centre 1998.  Pleomele halaapepe.   2006 IUCN Red List of Threatened Species.   Downloaded on 23 August 2007.

halapepe
Endemic flora of Hawaii
Biota of Oahu
Trees of Hawaii
Plants described in 1985
Taxonomy articles created by Polbot